Mirren Mack (born 1997) is a Scottish actress, known for portraying Kaya on the BBC drama The Nest, Florence in Sex Education, Queenie in the National Theatre’s 2022 production of Small Island, and Princess/Empress Merwyn in the Netflix miniseries The Witcher: Blood Origin.

Early life
Mack was born in Stirling, Scotland. From a young age, she was exposed to the entertainment industry, with her father, Billy, being an actor and her mother, Callan, being a drama tutor. Her younger sister, Molly, is also an actress. With sister Molly, she danced at the Glasgow 2014 Commonwealth Games. Mack went to Riverside Primary school and then Wallace High School in Stirling, In year five at High School, Mack attended the Dance School of Scotland's Musical Theatre. In 2016, she received the Dewar Arts Award for outstanding Scottish talent in the arts, enabling her the opportunity to audition for a place at the Guildhall School of Music and Drama, where she studied a Bachelor of Arts in Acting.

Career
Mack made her professional acting debut in a stage production of Bat Boy as Mayor Maggie, at the Citizen's Theatre, for which she won the Musical Theatre Award and the drama award for her year.

In 2019, Mack made her television debut in three episodes of the Netflix series Sex Education as Florence. In 2020, Mack was cast in her first leading role as Kaya on the BBC drama series The Nest alongside Martin Compston and Sophie Rundle.  Mack came out of Covid lockdown to appear in the 7th series of Portrait Artist of the Year on Sky Arts.

Mack began filming of the Netflix miniseries The Witcher: Blood Origin in August 2021, set in a time 1,200 years before The Witcher, and appeared in a main role as Princess Merwyn in a cast that includes Lenny Henry, Laurence O'Fuarain and Michelle Yeoh. The series was released on Netflix on 25 December 2022.

Stage performances have included the play Wound by Philip Ridley in 2020. In 2022, as Ophelia in the Bristol Old Vic's adaption of Shakespeare's Hamlet. and the same year as Queenie in Small Island at the Royal National Theatre in London.

Filmography

Film

Television

Stage

Awards and nominations

References

External links
 
|work= stirlingevents.org Mirren Mack – Sterling Events Tolbooth Talk, 18 June 2020

1997 births
Living people
21st-century Scottish actresses
Alumni of the Guildhall School of Music and Drama
People from Stirling
Scottish stage actresses
Scottish television actresses